is a Japanese novel written by Kanako Nishi and published by Gentosha in April 2014. A manga adaptation with art by Sugisaku has been serialized online via Gentosha's Comic Boost website since January 29, 2021. It has been collected in two tankōbon volumes. An anime film adaptation by Studio 4°C premiered in Japan on June 11, 2021.

Characters

Atsushi Yamanishi and Yuichi Yasoda had been cast in unspecified roles.

Media

Novel

Manga

Film

An anime film adaptation by Studio 4°C was announced on January 1, 2021, with Ayumu Watanabe as director, Satomi Ooshima as scriptwriter, Sanma Akashiya as producer, and Kenichi Konishi designing the characters.  The film premiered on June 11, 2021. In October 2021, the film was screened In Competition as part of the Scotland Loves Animation film festival, where it won the "Golden Partridge" Jury Award.

Reception
The novel has more than 350,000 copies in print.

References

External links
 

2014 Japanese novels
Anime and manga based on novels
Drama anime and manga
Gentosha
Gentosha manga
Japanese novels adapted into films
Japanese webcomics
Seinen manga